Bahmanabad-e Olya (also Romanized as Bahmanābād-e ‘Olyā; also known as Rashnowābād) is a village in Zarrin Dasht Rural District, in the Central District of Darreh Shahr County, Ilam Province, Iran. At the 2006 census, its population was 248, in 54 families. The village is populated by Kurds and Lurs.

References 

Populated places in Darreh Shahr County
Kurdish settlements in Ilam Province
Luri settlements in Ilam Province